Goodwin is a populated place situated in Yavapai County, Arizona, United States.

See also
 John N. Goodwin – First Territorial Governor of Arizona and namesake of the community

References

External links
 Goodwin – ghosttowns.com

Populated places in Yavapai County, Arizona
Ghost towns in Arizona